Carla Taylor (born April 29, 1961) was the head women's basketball coach at Weber State University. In 23 seasons as a head coach, she has amassed a 308-341 record, including a 180-170 mark in Big Sky play. She owns the second most wins in Big Sky history. She was hired as one of the youngest college coach in the nation at age 26.

She played basketball at Weber State on the 1982 team that went to the WNIT tournament. She ranks 12th in school history in points scored with 1122, and ninth in assists with 301.

In 2015, Taylor was honored by the Utah Sports Hall of Fame Foundation and was inducted as a Utah Coach of Merit at the spring induction banquet.

References

Weber State Wildcats women's basketball coaches
Weber State University alumni
Living people
American women's basketball coaches
American women's basketball players
Place of birth missing (living people)
1968 births
21st-century American women